Youssouf Simpara (born 30 June 1979) is a former Malian sprinter who competed in the 2000 Summer Olympics in the men's 100m competition, achieving a time of 10.82 in his first heat, not enough to advance.

References

Living people
1979 births
Malian male sprinters
Athletes (track and field) at the 2000 Summer Olympics
Olympic athletes of Mali
21st-century Malian people
Place of birth missing (living people)